Woodbine Avenue is a north–south arterial road consisting of two sections in Toronto and York Region in Ontario, Canada.

Route description
The southern section in Toronto runs just under , and begins near Ashbridges Bay on the shore of Lake Ontario, at Lake Shore Boulevard, which ends by curving north to default into Woodbine. Woodbine then continues north to O'Connor Drive.

The northern section runs from Steeles Avenue at the Toronto-Markham border and extends  to the shore of Lake Simcoe, ending at Lake Drive East in Georgina. York Region designates this section as York Regional Road 8. Woodbine Avenue runs parallel to Highway 404, with the highway's northern terminus branching off it just south of Ravenshoe Road in East Gwillimbury. Woodbine in York Region is six lanes wide from Steeles Avenue to Highway 7, and four lanes wide from Highway 7 to north of Elgin Mills Road, passing through the Markham neighbourhoods of Buttonville, Cachet, and Cathedraltown, with a bypass around the preserved former rural community of Victoria Square. North of Elgin Mills, Woodbine narrows to a two-lane rural road.  

There is also a short former third section immediately to the north of the Toronto section; cut off by the Taylor-Massey Creek, in the Parkview Hills neighbourhood, which is today named Woodbine Heights Boulevard. It runs for four blocks and ends at the East Don Valley of the Don River.

Union Street in Gormley is a former alignment of Woodbine at Stouffville Road.

History
 Woodbine was a single lane paved concession road (third concession line laid 19,800 ft (6,000 m) east of Yonge Street, with the northern section running to south of York Mills Road with an unopened road allowance extending southwards to beyond Lawrence Avenue. An abandoned stub of the old road south of York Mills Road remains behind a fenced off wooded area on the east side of the Don Valley Parkway where the parkway crosses a ravine. 

It was named for Woodbine Racetrack, later known as Greenwood Raceway. Beyond Lawrence Avenue and especially south of Eglinton Avenue the road allowance was not feasible for a roadway due to the valley along the Don River. It is also believed that former racetrack-owner William J. (Jiggs) Howell (along with either Raymond Pardee or Dennis Pard) operated a tavern at then 88 Yonge Street (west side of Yonge north of King Street near the Fairweather Building c. 1918) called "The Woodbine House" or "The Woodbine", which was re-used by Howell for his horse track.

The southern terminus of Woodbine Avenue was originally at Eastern Avenue, but was extended a short distance in the mid 1950's to tie into the eastern end of the then-new Lake Shore Boulevard. In Toronto, portions of unopened and open road allowances for Woodbine Avenue north of Eglinton Avenue to Highway 401 were removed when the Don Valley Parkway was constructed in the 1960's. Another section from Highway 401 to Steeles Avenue was lost when Highway 404 was built over it during the 1970's. Woodbine was retained north of Steeles through York Region by swinging the route of Highway 404 to the west, with the Parclo A4 interchange with Steeles including a Y-junction to accommodate traffic to and from Woodbine. Victoria Park Avenue, a major north–south arterial extending north from the City of Toronto, terminates shortly after the intersection with Steeles, with Woodbine absorbing most of this traffic.

In the early 2000's, new housing development necessitated the widening of Woodbine Avenue through northern Markham to cope with increased traffic levels. However, due to residences and heritage properties in the community of Victoria Square, including a cemetery, a new four-lane section of Woodbine was constructed on a new alignment which included a new intersection with Elgin Mills Road. The new alignment, which was initially known as Woodbine Avenue By-Pass, opened on November 15, 2010. The bypassed section of Woodbine Avenue was renamed Victoria Square Boulevard to reflect the location of the road within the area of Victoria Square and transferred to the jurisdiction of the city of Markham. However, the bypass retained the Woodbine Avenue By-Pass name even after the renaming of the bypassed segment until November 2015, when it was finally decided to redesignate it as part of Woodbine Avenue proper. The former alignment, Victoria Square Boulevard, intersects Woodbine at both ends.

In 2017, the City of Toronto installed Cycle Tracks (protected bike lanes) to Woodbine Ave spanning from O'Connor Dr to Queen St E.

Public Transit

Transit service along Woodbine began in 1921 by Hollinger Bus Lines. The Woodbine route ran from Danforth north to O'Connor Drive. Before then residents along the road was assumed would not likely be travelling south or could walk to their destination. Woodbine intersected with a few east–west streetcar lines:

 Queen - began service in 1880 by Toronto Street Railway (TSR), transferred to Toronto Railway Company (TRC) in 1891 and taken over by the TTC in 1921

 King - began service in 1888 by the TSR, transferred to TRC in 1891 and taken over by the TTC in 1921; route ran on Queen when it reached Woodbine and now numbered as 504

 Lee (Avenue) - operated by the TSR 1889-1891, transferred to the TRC in 1891 and merged into King route in 1893; route ran on Queen when it reached Woodbine

 Woodbine - operated by the TSR 1887 to 1891, transferred to the TRC 1891 and merged with King route in 1893; route ran on Queen when it reached Woodbine

 Gerrard - began service in 1912 by the city owned Toronto Civic Railways (TCR) and taken over by the TTC in 1921; now numbered as 506 

 Danforth - began service in 1913 by the TCR and transferred to the TTC in 1921; merged with Bloor route in 1923 and replaced by Bloor Danforth subway line in 1966

The privately operated Hollinger route was taken over by the TTC in 1954 and retained route name. The opening of Woodbine subway station in 1966 changed transit patterns, as many residents now needed to get all the way north to Danforth.

Today Woodbine is served by five different routes and two operators. The northern part of the route, from Danforth to O'Connor is served by the TTC 91 Woodbine and 93 Parkview Hills bus routes. South of Danforth is served by TTC 92 Woodbine South bus route.

In Markham the road is served by the 24 Woodbine YRT route. The far north of the road, through the town of Keswick is served by YRT 51 Keswick Local.

Neighbourhoods and communities

Woodbine serves a number of neighbourhoods and rural communities in Toronto and York Region:

 The Beaches
 Woodbine Heights
 Parkview Hills
 Buttonville
 Cachet
 Cathedraltown
 Victoria Square (now bypassed)
 Gormley
 Preston Lake
 Vandorf
 Wesley Corners
 Pleasantville  
 Queensville
 Maple Hill
 Keswick 
 Island Grove

Landmarks
Landmarks and notable sites along Woodbine from south to north:

Southern section

Northern section

Distinction from Woodbine Racetrack
Woodbine Racetrack is in Etobicoke, and not anywhere close to Woodbine Avenue. Greenwood Race Track used to be located at the south end of Woodbine Avenue until it was demolished in 1994. Greenwood Race Track was the original Woodbine Racetrack until the construction of the current Woodbine Racetrack in 1956. The name was then transferred to the new facility. Known as "Old Woodbine Race Track" for several years, the facility changed its name to Greenwood Race Track after nearby Greenwood Avenue.

Woodbine Building Supply fire
On Christmas Eve in 2001, the Woodbine Building Supply fire occurred. The store was located at the intersection of Danforth and Woodbine. It was one of the biggest fires in Toronto's history, as 170 firefighters were required to bring the six-alarm blaze under control. The building was less than 50 metres from residences in the neighborhood and more than 50 families had to evacuate their homes on Christmas morning. One person was killed and another was severely disfigured. Police and insurance quickly suspected arson and several people have been convicted.

References

Roads in Toronto
Roads in Markham, Ontario